Zemo Nikozi is a village in the Shida Kartli region of central Georgia near the Russian and south Ossetian military forces' check-point.  It is the birthplace of Patriarch Kyrion II of Georgia. Nikozi is One of Georgia's oldest villages and home to early Christian churches and historical monuments. Nikozi is selected for the 5th Animation International Film Festival September. 2015. The annual Nikozi International Animated Film Festival will be held at the Episcopal Palace of the Nikozi Monastery. The Palace was completely destroyed in the 2008 August war however the festival has given the area new life and become a cultural centre for the town's youth.  There is Nikozi Art School in the city.

See also 
 Zemo Nikozi church of the Deity
 Zemo Nikozi church of the Archangel

See also
 Shida Kartli

References

Populated places in Shida Kartli